Bermo subdivision is an administrative subdivision of the Bokaro district in the North Chotanagpur division in the state of Jharkhand, India.

History
Bokaro district was created on 1 April 1991 by taking out Chas and Chandankiyari CD blocks of Dhanbad district and the entire Bermo subdivision of Giridih district and merging them. Earlier, in 1972, Giridih district, including Bermo subdivision, was carved out of Hazaribagh district.

Administrative set up
Bokaro district has two subdivisions:

Urban frame
Phusro is the only statutory town in Bermo subdivision. It has 21 census towns: Bhandra, Telo, Narra, Chandrapura, Bursera, Dugda, Sijhua, Termi, Bermo, Kurpania, Bokaro (Thermal), Gomia, Saram, Hasir, Jaridih Bazar, Tenudam-cum-Kathara, Tenu, Lalpania, Jena, Bandh Dih and Tanr Balidih.

The percentage of the population living in the urban areas is very high in Bermo CD block at 97.78%, and it is reasonably high in Chandrapura CD block at 63.09% and in Gomia CD block at 43.38%.

Rural frame
There are 363 inhabited villages in Bermo subdivision.

Police stations
Police stations in Bermo subdivision were at:
Bermo
Chandrapura
Dugda
Gomia
IEL
Jaridih
Kasmar
Mahuatand
Nawadih
Petarwar
Pindrajora

Blocks
Community development blocks in Bermo subdivision are

Economy

Collieries
Projects of the Central Coalfields in Bermo subdivision are given below:

.*Located outside the subdivision

Damoda colliery in the Barora Area of BCCL is in Bermo subdivision.

Dugda Coal Washery of BCCL at Dugda has two units: Dugda I with annual capacity of 1 million tonnes per year washes non-coking coal, Dugda II with annual capacity of 2 million tonnes per year washes coking coal.

Tenughat Dam
The four main multipurpose dams of the Damodar Valley Corporation, located at Tilaiya, Konar, Maithon and Panchet were commissioned during 1953–1959. In addition, a single purpose reservoir on the main stream, the Damodar, at Tenughat (with live storage 224 million m3 and without provision for flood storage) was constructed later in 1974. While the four earlier dams are controlled by Damodar Valley Corporation, Tenughat Dam is controlled by the Government of Jharkhand.

Thermal Power Plants
Bokaro (Thermal) has two power plants:
BTPS 'A' was started in 1952 and closed down on 17 July 2000 for violating pollution norms. A new efficient 500MW has been set up in May 2016.
BTPS 'B' has an installed capacity of 630 MW. The first unit was commissioned in March 1986. The station is located on the banks of the Konar River near Bokaro ‘A’ Thermal Power Station.

Chandrapura Thermal Power Station is a thermal power plant located in Chandrapura, operated by the Damodar Valley Corporation. It has 3 units with a total installed capacity of 630 MW. All of the units are coal-based.

Tenughat Thermal Power Station is a coal-based thermal power plant located at Lalpania, owned by Jharkhand State owned Tenughat Vidyut Nigam Limited,
with an installed capacity of 420 MW (2x210 MW).

Explosives
Indian Explosives Ltd. set up a plant at Gomia in 1954.

Education
In 2011, in Bermo subdivision out of a total 363 inhabited villages there were 63 villages with pre-primary schools, 340 villages with primary schools, 193 villages with middle schools, 51 villages with secondary schools, 23 villages with senior secondary schools, 6 locations with general degree colleges, 2 locations with non-formal training centres, 3 locations with vocational training institutes, 1 polytechnic, 20 villages with no educational facility.
.*Senior secondary schools are also known as Inter colleges in Jharkhand

Educational institutions
The following institutions are located in Bermo subdivision:
Krishna Ballav Mahavidyalaya, established in 1964, at Bermo.
Jhabbu Singh Memorial College, established in 1980, at Phusro.

(Information about degree colleges with proper reference may be added here)

Healthcare
In 2011, in Bermo subdivision there were 16 villages with primary health centres, 69 villages with primary health subcentres, 17 villages with maternity and child welfare centres,  11 villages with allopathic hospitals, 20 villages with dispensaries, 5 villages with veterinary hospitals, 11 villages with family welfare centres, 38 villages with medicine shops.
.*Private medical practitioners, alternative medicine etc. not included

Medical facilities
(Anybody having referenced information about location of government/ private medical facilities may please add it here)

References

Sub-divisions in Jharkhand